Juuso Akkanen (born December 22, 1983) is a Finnish professional ice hockey player who played with TPS in the SM-liiga during the 2010-11 season.

References

External links

1983 births
Living people
Finnish ice hockey defencemen
HC TPS players
People from Rauma, Finland
Sportspeople from Satakunta